The Turkmenistan women's national football team is the representative women's association football team of Turkmenistan. Its governing body is the Football Federation of Turkmenistan (TFF) and it competes as a member of the Asian Football Confederation (AFC).

The national team's first activity was in 2019, when they played a friendly game against Kazakhstan. They competed in the 2019 Turkish Women's Cup, finishing in last place. As of June 2022, Turkmenistan is unranked in the FIFA Women's World Rankings.

Record per opponent
Key

The following table shows Turkmenistan women's all-time official international record per opponent:

Results
Legend

2019

2022

See also
 Turkmenistan national football team results

References

External links
 Turkmenistan results on The Roon Ba

Results women
2010s in Turkmenistani sport

Women's national association football team results